Senator Lipscomb may refer to:

Albert Lipscomb (born 1951), Alabama State Senate
Mark Lipscomb Jr. (born 1935), Wisconsin State Senate